Toxic megacolon is an acute form of colonic distension. It is characterized by a very dilated colon (megacolon), accompanied by abdominal distension (bloating), and sometimes fever, abdominal pain, or shock.

Toxic megacolon is usually a complication of inflammatory bowel disease, such as ulcerative colitis and, more rarely, Crohn's disease, and of some infections of the colon, including Clostridium difficile infections, which have led to pseudomembranous colitis. Other forms of megacolon exist and can be congenital (present since birth, such as Hirschsprung's disease). It can also be caused by Entamoeba histolytica and Shigella. It may also be caused by the use of loperamide.

Signs and symptoms
 Abdominal bloating
 Abdominal pain
 Abdominal tenderness
 Dehydration
 Fever
 Tachycardia (rapid heart rate)

There may be signs of septic shock. A physical examination reveals abdominal tenderness and possible loss of bowel sounds. An abdominal radiography shows colonic dilation. White blood cell count is usually elevated. Severe sepsis may present with hypothermia or leukopenia.

Complications
 Perforation of the colon
 Sepsis
 Shock

Emergency action may be required if severe abdominal pain develops, particularly if it is accompanied by fever, rapid heart rate, tenderness when the abdomen is pressed, bloody diarrhea, frequent diarrhea, or painful bowel movements.

Colonoscopy is contraindicated, as it may rupture the dilated colon resulting in peritonitis and septic shock.

Pathophysiology

The pathological process involves inflammation and damage to the colonic wall with unknown toxins breaking down the protective mucosal barrier and exposing the muscularis propria. There is relative destruction of the ganglion cells and swelling of the nerve fibers in the myenteric plexus, with concomitant damage to the colonic musculature. This results in almost complete paralysis of the diseased segment of the colon with loss of smooth muscle substance, tone and motility. This can lead to further complications as pressure builds up in the colon due to relative fecal stasis including sepsis, intestinal hemorrhage or free perforation and spontaneous decompression.

Diagnosis
Massively dilated colon with air-fluid level can be seen on abdominal radiograph or CT scan.

Treatment
The objective of treatment is to decompress the bowel and to prevent swallowed air from further distending the bowel. If decompression is not achieved or the patient does not improve with medical management, surgery is indicated. When surgery is required the recommended procedure is a colectomy (surgical removal of all or part of the colon) with end ileostomy. Fluid and electrolyte replacement help to prevent dehydration and shock. Use of corticosteroids may be indicated to suppress the inflammatory reaction in the colon if megacolon has resulted from active inflammatory bowel disease. Antibiotics may be given to prevent sepsis.

Prognosis
If the condition does not improve, the risk of death is significant. In case of poor response to conservative therapy, a colectomy is usually required.

References

Further reading

External links 

Diseases of intestines
Large intestine